IF Hallby is a sports club in Jönköping, Sweden, established on 7 April 1929. It originally ran cross-country skiing, soccer, track and field athletics and ice skating, and the club won the 1932 speed skating district team championship. Handball was adopted in 1933 and orienteering in 1934. On 1 June 2001, the club became an alliance club.

The men's handball team has played four seasons in the Swedish top division  and the women's handball team has played in the Swedish top division for two seasons.

The men's soccer team played 19 seasons in Division III, back then the Swedish third division, between 1943–1983.

An important gathering-place for the club is Hallbystugan, which is located in a popular outdoor recreation area, near Axamo.

Handball

The club currently competes in Handbollsligan, the top domestic handball league.

Sports Hall information

Name: – Jönköpings idrottshus
City: – Jönköping
Capacity: – 1500
Address: – Lagermansgatan 4, 553 18 Jönköping, Sweden

Kits

References

External links
  
 

1929 establishments in Sweden
Athletics clubs in Sweden
Cycling clubs
Defunct bandy clubs in Sweden
Figure skating clubs in Sweden
Football clubs in Sweden
Sport in Jönköping
Orienteering clubs in Sweden
Ski clubs in Sweden
Speed skating clubs
Association football clubs established in 1929
Bandy clubs established in 1929
Swedish handball clubs
Multi-sport clubs in Sweden